Jason Ian Douglas Kerr (born 7 April 1974 in Bolton, Greater Manchester) is an English cricket coach and former first-class cricketer, who is currently head coach of Somerset County Cricket Club.

An all-rounder, he played as right-handed batsman, who bowled right-arm medium-fast. He played first-class cricket for Somerset from 1993, before moving to Derbyshire in 2001.

After back injury curtailed his career at the end of 2002, Bridgwater Cricket Club appointed Kerr as director of coaching in 2004 to spearhead their West of England Premier League promotion bid. He succeeded Ben Wellington, who resigned in early February 2004 because of his commitments as a full-time coach at Somerset's Centre of Excellence. Kerr returned to Somerset as a self-employed coach in 2005, before taking up the Academy Directors post full-time in February 2006, replacing the ECB bound Kevin Shine. At the end of the 2013 season, Kerr was promoted to the role of First XI bowling coach.

In October 2017, following the departure of Director of Cricket Matthew Maynard, Kerr was promoted to head coach of Somerset.

References

External links 
 
 
 Interview re role at Somerset Academy

1974 births
Living people
Cricketers from Bolton
English cricketers
Somerset cricketers
Derbyshire cricketers
English cricket coaches